Egor Ivanovich Vyaltsev (born 10 October 1985) is a Russian professional basketball player who plays for Samara. He also represents the senior Russian national basketball team.

Professional career
Vyaltsev has spent his entire career playing for teams in the Russian Professional Championship. In his most recent season, 2008–09, he averaged 5.7 points per game for Triumph Lyubertsy. In June 2011 he signed a one-year contract with Khimki.

Russian national basketball team
Vyaltsev played with the Russian junior national teams between 2002 and 2004, most notably appearing with the Russian junior teams at the 2002 FIBA Europe Under-18 Championship, and the 2004 FIBA Europe Under-20 Championship.

Vyaltsev has also been a member of the senior Russian national basketball team.  He was called up to the senior national team for the first time at EuroBasket 2009, and saw action in four games with the team.  Although the Russians finished a disappointing seventh, they were later awarded a wild card to the 2010 FIBA World Championship.

References

External links

 Egor Vyaltsev at eurobasket.com
 Egor Vyaltsev at euroleague.net
 Egor Vyaltsev at fiba.com
 Egor Vyaltsev at fibaeurope.com

1985 births
Living people
BC Khimki players
BC Samara players
BC Zenit Saint Petersburg players
PBC CSKA Moscow players
PBC Ural Great players
Russian men's basketball players
Shooting guards
Sportspeople from Voronezh